James Petras (born 17 January 1937) is a retired Bartle Professor (Emeritus) of Sociology at Binghamton University in Binghamton, New York and adjunct professor at Saint Mary's University, Halifax, Nova Scotia, Canada who has published on political issues with particular focus on Latin America and the Middle East, imperialism, globalization, and leftist social movements.

Life and work

Academic and Literature

Petras - a Greek-American - received his B.A. from Boston University and Ph.D. from the University of California at Berkeley. His initial appointment at Binghamton was in 1972 at the Sociology Department and his field is listed as: Development, Latin America, the Caribbean, revolutionary movements, class analysis. During his career he received the Western Political Science Association's the Best Dissertation award (1968), the Career of Distinguished Service Award from the American Sociological Association's Marxist Sociology Section, and the Robert Kenny Award for Best Book of 2002.

Petras is the author of more than 60 books published in 29 languages, and over 600 articles in professional journals, including the American Sociological Review, British Journal of Sociology, Social Research and Journal of Peasant Studies. He has published over 2,000 articles in publications such as the New York Times, The Guardian, The Nation, Christian Science Monitor, Foreign Policy, New Left Review, Partisan Review, Canadian Dimension, and Le Monde Diplomatique. Currently he writes a monthly column for the Mexican newspaper, La Jornada, and previously, for the Spanish daily, El Mundo.  His commentary is widely carried on the internet and radio stations around the world.

Petras currently contributes to CounterPunch, Atlantic Free Press. and The Unz Review. His later books include Unmasking Globalization: Imperialism of the Twenty-First Century (2001); co-author The Dynamics of Social Change in Latin America (2000), System in Crisis (2003), co-author Social Movements and State Power (2003), co-author Empire With Imperialism (2005), co-author Multinationals on Trial (2006).

Political views
Petras was prominently involved in the Young Socialist Alliance circa 1960, and is listed as the Bay Area correspondent for The Young Socialist in several issues. Through the decades Petras has worked directly with indigenous workers as an organizer, in particular with the Brazilian Landless Workers' Movement and the unemployed workers' movement in Argentina.

He has advised left-wing presidents like President Andreas Papandreou (Greece 1981-84), President Salvador Allende of Chile (1970–73) and in recent years, President Hugo Chávez, and defended the rights of the indigenous in Latin America. From 1973-76 Petras worked on the Bertrand Russell Tribunal on Repression in Latin America.

Petras has referred to American policy towards Iraq as "The US/Iraqi Holocaust (UIH)" which he describes as "an ongoing process spanning the last 16 years (1990-2006) provides us with a striking example of state-planned systematic extermination, torture and physical destruction designed to de-modernize a secular developing society and revert it into a series of warring clan-tribal-clerical-ethnic based entities devoid of any national authority or viable economy."

In November 2006, FARC in Colombia addressed a letter concerning three American hostages (Keith Stansell, Marc Gonsalves and Thomas Howes) to American film stars, the Reverend Jesse Jackson and leftist intellectuals Noam Chomsky, Angela Davis, and James Petras.

Describing the political conflict during and following the 2009 presidential election in Iran as pitting "high income, free market oriented capitalist" reformists against Ahmadinejad's "working class, low income, community-based supporters of a 'moral economy'", he denounced the narrative that the election was stolen as a "hoax" perpetrated by "Western opinion makers".

Petras defended Marine Le Pen during the 2017 French presidential campaign, praising her policy views as pro-working class, anti-imperialist, Keynesian, pro-choice, and supportive of gay rights. Petras predicted that a victory by Emmanuel Macron followed by his implementation of an "ultra-neoliberal supply-side agenda"
would lead to mass street demonstrations by leftists, followed by a stronger Le Pen candidacy in the 2022 election.

Anti-Zionism, criticisms of the Jewish lobby and allegations of antisemitism
Petras' 2006 book The Power of Israel in the United States, published by Clarity Press, described the power of the Jewish lobby over American foreign policy, and was extremely controversial for its close parallels to historic neo-Nazi arguments describing Jews as a loathsome, conspiratorial force seeking to oppress others. The conclusion of the book alleges that progressive Jews are "protective of everything Jewish" and "adamantly determined" to avoid criticism of Jewish power, due to their ties to Israel and funding from Jewish organizations. Petras particularly singles out Noam Chomsky as "apologist [for] the US Jewish lobby", asserting that Chomsky loses his power of analysis when it comes to addressing "the role of his own ethnic group". In a debate with Norman Finkelstein, a former student of James Petras at SUNY Binghamton, about the book, Finkelstein described the book as having a conspiratorial "cloak and dagger" approach to geopolitics which contrasted sharply with a Marxist analysis, while Petras accused Finkelstein of downplaying Jewish power: "I am afraid that when it comes to dealing with the predominantly Jewish lobby, he has a certain blind spot, which is understandable. In many other national and ethnic groups -- where they can criticize the world but [not] when it comes to identifying the power and malfeasance of their own group."

In his 2008 book, If I Am Not For Myself: Journal of an Anti-Zionist Jew, leftist writer Mike Marqusee criticised Petras' "overt antisemitism": "Petras... seems unaware of the way postulates about the secret power of a pro-Israel Jewish network echo older [antisemitic] themes." Marqusee particularly criticised Petras' dismissal of Finkelstein's and Chomsky's criticisms of his position, which Petras attributes to an ethnically-grounded blindness to the negative role of American Jews, which Marqusee described as "a circular, inherently racist argument." Marqusee concluded that Petras is not an internationalist, but an America first nationalist. The leftist writer Michael Bérubé similarly criticised the book, describing it as reading like "a fringe far-right figure such as David Duke" Allen Ruff, a Trotkyist historian, reviewed the book in Against The Current and noted that "There’s a strong undercurrent here of an appeal to a far-from-savory American nationalism which seems very strange coming from a veteran revolutionary anti-imperialist", and that Petras blurs distinctions between terms such as Jewish lobby, Israel lobby and Zionist lobby and "lapses into the well-worn dual-loyalty discourse" about Jews, in a manner reminiscent of "elements of the far right".

Other scholars and anti-racists have also described Petras as an antisemite. In a 2006 article entitled "9/11 Anti-Semitic Conspiracy Theories Still Abound," the Anti-Defamation League (ADL) criticized Petras's assertion that US federal investigators had reason to believe that 60 Israelis arrested under the Patriot Act after the September 11, 2001 terrorist attacks may have had advance knowledge about the attacks. The ADL also noted Petras' assertion that "The lack of any public statement concerning Israel's possible knowledge of 9/11 is indicative of the vast, ubiquitous and aggressive nature of its powerful diaspora supporters."
	
In a 2009 article, the ADL again criticized Petras, alleging that he blamed the ongoing economic crisis on "Zionist" control over the U.S. government and world events, and that Petras argued that pro-Israel Americans had launched a massive campaign to push the U.S. into a war with Iran. The ADL also criticised what they described as Petras' antisemitic accusation that the American Jewish community controls the mass media and is "bloodthirsty" in its appetite for war. The previous year, Petras alleged that "It was the massive infusion of financial contributions that allowed the [Zionist Power Configuration] (ZPC) to vastly expand the number of full-time functionaries, influence peddlers and electoral contributors that magnified their power – especially in promoting US Middle East wars, lopsided free trade agreements (in favor of Israel) and unquestioned backing of Israeli aggression against Lebanon, Syria and Palestine...No economic recovery is possible now or in the foreseeable future...while Zionist power brokers dictate US Mideast policies. The ADL also cited a 2008 interview in which Petras stated that [U.S.] presidents are at the disposal of Jewish power  and maintained that Jews represent "the greatest threat to world peace and humanity." In the same 2008 interview cited by the ADL, Petras stated that "it’s one of the great tragedies that we have a minority that represents less than 2% of North American’s population but has such power in the communications media" and that the reason "why the North American public doesn’t react against the manipulations of this minority...[is] because the Jews control the communications media." In a 2010 article published in the Arab American News, Petras stated that "For the U.S. mass media the problem is not Israeli state terror, but how to manipulate and disarm the outrage of the international community. To that end the entire Zionist power configuration has a reliable ally in the Zionized Obama White House and U.S. Congress."

In 2011 and again in 2017, Petras endorsed works by Gilad Atzmon which have been described as antisemitic.

In 2011, Mark Gardner of the Community Security Trust, which monitors antisemitism in the UK, wrote an article in the left-wing magazine Dissent saying that Petras' works "present a conspiracy theory that... fits resoundingly with the late-nineteenth and early-twentieth-century socialist linkage of Jews with capitalism, now updated and repackaged for twenty-first-century anti-capitalist discourse." In 2014, Marxist scholar Werner Bonefeld described Petras as exemplary of a current of antisemitism on the anti-imperialist left: "The Jews [in Petras' work] have not only conquered Palestine; they have also taken control of America, or as James Petras sees it, the current effort of 'U.S. empire building' is shaped by 'Zionist empire builders.'" Similarly, author and researcher Paul Bogdanor, writing in an academic book published by Indiana University Press, focusing on the same texts as Gardner, described Petras as "articulat[ing] his theory of the organized American Jewish community as a 'Zionist Power Configuration' (ZPC)—an acronym that he apparently developed as a substitute for the neo-Nazi term 'Zionist Occupation Government' (ZOG)... and cautions against 'the role of the Zionist/Jewish Lobby in promoting future US wars.' None of this material is readily distinguishable from contemporary neo-Nazi propaganda."

Selected bibliography
 The Arab Revolt and the Imperialist Counterattack, Clarity Press, Inc. (2011).   
 War Crimes in Gaza and the Zionist Fifth Column in America, Clarity Press, Inc. (2010).   
 Zionism, Militarism and the Decline of US Power, Clarity Press, Inc. (2008). 
 Rulers and Ruled in the US Empire: Bankers, Zionists and Militants, Clarity Press, Inc. (2007). 
 The Power of Israel in the United States, Clarity Press, Inc. (2006). 
 Empire with Imperialism: The Globalizing Dynamics of Neoliberal Capitalism, Luciano Vasapollo, Zed Books (2006).
 Social Movements and State Power: Argentina, Brazil, Bolivia, Ecuador, with Henry Veltmeyer, Pluto Press (2005).
 Globalization Unmasked: Imperialism in the 21st Century, with Henry Veltmeyer, Zed Books (2001).
 The Dynamics of Social Change in Latin America, with Henry Veltmeyer, Palgrave Macmillan (2000).
 Empire or Republic: Global Power or Domestic Decay in the US, with Morris Morley, Routledge (1994).
 Latin America in the Time of Cholera: Electoral Politics, Market Economics, and Permanent Crisis, Routledge (1992).

References

External links
 James Petras Website
 Entrevista a James Petras sobre ONG (castellano)

1937 births
Living people
American Marxists
American sociologists
Binghamton University faculty
State University of New York faculty
The Nation (U.S. magazine) people